Siwan Morris is a Welsh actress from Glynneath. Morris has appeared in various parts for the Royal Shakespeare Company. Morris' television roles have included Angie in series 1 and 2 of the teen comedy-drama series Skins (2007–2008), Ceri in series 1 to 3 of the teen drama series Wolfblood (2012–2014), and several Welsh-language TV drama shows. In May 2020, she appeared in an episode of the BBC soap opera Doctors as Jessica Dale.

References

External links

Welsh television actresses
Living people
People from Neath Port Talbot
20th-century Welsh actresses
21st-century Welsh actresses
Year of birth missing (living people)